Justerini & Brooks is a fine wine and spirits merchant founded in St. James's in 1749, originally to provide wine and spirits to the aristocratic households of London. The firm has been a supplier to every British monarch since the coronation of King George III in 1761. It sells to private collectors, hotels, and restaurants across the United Kingdom. Justerini & Brooks is owned by multinational Diageo.

History 
Justerini and Brooks was founded in 1749 by Giacomo Justerini from Bologna, the son of a distiller, and English investor George Johnson. Together, they founded the wine merchants Johnson & Justerini. In 1760, Justerini returned to his native land after selling the business to Johnson. Johnson continued to grow the business, naming his grandson, Augustus, as a partner, and building relationships with European suppliers from Bordeaux, Cadiz, Mayence, Reims, Genoa, Dijon and Palermo. The firm received its first Royal Warrant from King George III the next year.

In 1831, the Johnson family sold its interest in the business to Alfred Brooks. The firm was renamed Justerini & Brooks and its headquarters were established in Regent's Park. The New York office opened in 1866.

Today, the company has four offices: the head office in St James's Street, a further office in London's Golden Square, and sales offices in Edinburgh and Hong Kong. Justerini & Brooks is also the main user of the Octavian Vaults, a giant, thirty-acre high-security cellar in Wiltshire. The company operates three other storage warehouses in Bordeaux, Hong Kong, and in Hertfordshire.

Wine and spirits 
Justerini & Brooks are known for their selection of fine wines from Burgundy, Barolo and Germany. They are also known for their J&B Rare whisky, a blend of forty-two malt and grain whiskies, including single malts Knockando, Auchroisk and Glen Spey.

In popular culture 
Throughout the 1970s, J&B whisky bottles cropped up with remarkable regularity in Italian poliziotteschi, commedia sexy all'italiana and particularly giallo films as a signifier of sophistication and virility, probably influenced by the brand's popularity among the Italian American celebrities Frank Sinatra and Dean Martin.

In the novel American Psycho by Bret Easton Ellis, the main character Patrick Bateman is a habitual drinker of J&B.

In the 1982 John Carpenter remake of "The Thing", helicopter pilot R.J. MacCready, played by Kurt Russell, is shown throughout the movie drinking J&B.

References

External links 
 
 J&B on uk.thebar.com
 J&B on MasterofMalt.com
 J&B on Whisky.com
 J&B In The Movies database

Diageo brands
Blended Scotch whisky
Wine merchants